The 8.8 cm Flak 16 was a German 8.8 cm anti-aircraft gun from World War I,  forerunner of the 8,8 cm FlaK/PaK Flak 18/36/37 of World War II. Its contemporary name was the 8,8 cm K.Zugflak L/45.

Development
Designs for dedicated anti-aircraft guns existed before World War I, but few were in service by the outbreak of war. Early anti-aircraft artillery guns used in World War I were primarily adaptations of existing medium-caliber weapons, mounted to enable fire at higher angles. By 1915, the German military command realized that these were useless for anything beyond deterrence, even against vulnerable balloons and slow-moving aircraft.  With the increase of aircraft performance, many armies developed dedicated AA guns with a high muzzle velocity – allowing the projectiles to reach greater altitudes.  The first such German gun, the Flak 16, was introduced in 1917, using the 88 mm caliber, common in the Kaiserliche Marine.

Design 
The barrel for the 8.8 cm K.Zugflak L/45 was built from steel and was 45 calibers in length. The gun had a semi-automatic Krupp horizontal sliding-wedge breech to boost its rate of fire.  There was a hydro-pneumatic recoil system located above and below the barrel, along with an equilibriator to balance the gun.  The gun was capable of 360° of traverse and -4° to +70° of elevation.

See also
 7.7 cm Leichte Kraftwagengeschütze M1914

Photo Gallery

References

External links
 http://www.passioncompassion1418.com/Canons/ImagesCanons/Allemagne/DCA/FC88Flak17Aberdeen.html

88 mm artillery
World War I anti-aircraft guns
World War I artillery of Germany
Anti-aircraft guns of Germany